Aidas a Lithuaian masculine given name meaning "echo."

Notable people with the given name Aidas include:
Aidas Bareikis (born 1967), Lithuanian artist
Aidas Preikšaitis (born 1970), Lithuanian footballer
Aidas Reklys (born 1982), Lithuanian figure skater

References

Masculine given names
Lithuanian masculine given names